Ward 2 is a ward of Bạc Liêu city in Bạc Liêu Province, Vietnam.

References

Communes of Bạc Liêu province
Populated places in Bạc Liêu province